Kim Seong-ju (Hangul: 김성주; born 15 November 1990) is a South Korean football player. He is a left-footed play-making midfielder.

Club statistics

References

External links
 
 
 Kim Seong-ju at Korea Football Association
 

1990 births
Living people
Association football midfielders
South Korean footballers
South Korea under-23 international footballers
South Korean expatriate footballers
Albirex Niigata players
Kataller Toyama players
Seoul E-Land FC players
Gimcheon Sangmu FC players
Ulsan Hyundai FC players
Jeju United FC players
Incheon United FC players
Pohang Steelers players
J1 League players
J2 League players
K League 2 players
K League 1 players
Expatriate footballers in Japan
South Korean expatriate sportspeople in Japan
People from Pohang
Sportspeople from North Gyeongsang Province